Comerica Bank is a subsidiary of Comerica Incorporated (NYSE: CMA), a financial services company headquartered in Dallas, Texas, and strategically aligned by three business segments: The Commercial Bank, The Retail Bank and Wealth Management. Under the leadership of chairman, President and chief executive officer Curt Farmer, Comerica focuses on relationships, and helping people and businesses be successful.

Comerica banking centers can be found in Texas, Michigan, California, Florida and Arizona, and it continues to expand its presence across the country. Identifying growth opportunities, Comerica established its new Southeast Market in 2021, with Raleigh, North Carolina, serving as the market headquarters in addition to establishing a Mountain West market. Comerica now has offices in 14 of the 15 largest U.S. metropolitan areas. Comerica remains one of the 25 largest U.S. financial holding companies and has the highest concentration of commercial and industrial loans among the top 20 U.S. Commercial Banks.

History

1800s 
At the start of 1849, there were just three banks in Detroit: Farmers & Mechanics’ Bank, Michigan Insurance Company Bank and the State Bank of Michigan. These three banks were commercial banks that served the business community. On August 17, 1849, Comerica was founded in Detroit by Elon Farnsworth, a lawyer and politician, as the Detroit Savings Fund Institute. Michigan Governor Epaphroditus Ransom signed an act authorizing the formation of the institute. Ransom also appointed 11 men of high repute to serve as trustees. These men served unpaid. The Institute's first location was an office that was adjacent and owned by Mariners’ Church.

An ad published in 1852-53 issue of Detroit's directory expressed the Institute's purpose at the time:

“The design of the Institution is to afford to those who are desirous of saving money, but who have not acquired sufficient to purchase a share in the banks, railroads, or a sum in public stocks, the means of employing their money to advantage…”

Unlike most banks of that time, the Institute paid interest on deposits, had no shareholders or capital stock, and was managed by unpaid fiduciaries. Courting customers from the working class, merchants and even children, the Institute enjoyed steady growth, reaching the $1 million mark in 1870.

In 1871, the state of Michigan passed a new law meant to encourage the formation of banks that offered both savings and commercial services. In response, the Institute transformed from a trust to a stockholder-owned corporation. Its name changed to The Detroit Savings Bank in 1871.

1900s 
In 1901, Detroit Savings Bank had 10,000 customers. By 1905, the bank had a staff of 21 employees, who managed a downtown main office and two branches.

As the banking situation in the nation became especially volatile in the 1930s, Detroit Savings Bank attempted to continue offering services. On multiple occasions in 1933, Detroit Savings Bank was the sole bank offering full personal and commercial services in Detroit. The Detroit Savings Bank changed its name to The Detroit Bank in 1936, being one of the few area banks to survive the Great Depression.

In 1956, the company merged with Birmingham National Bank, Ferndale National Bank and Detroit Wabeek Bank and Trust Company to form The Detroit Bank & Trust Company. As the bank's growth continued, so did its presence, opening its first foreign office in London in 1969. The early 1970s introduced new technological advancements to banking, which Detroit Bank & Trust would adopt. These advancements include Master Charge cards and automated teller machines (ATM) such as the Ultra/Matic 24. In 1973, it formed a holding company, DetroitBank Corporation. A year later, the Bank & Trust would celebrate its 125th anniversary.  The current name, Comerica, was adopted in 1982.

In 1982, Comerica entered the Florida market. In 1983, it acquired its hometown rival, Bank of the Commonwealth of Michigan. In the same year, Comerica entered California and Texas markets by offering auto financing services. It strengthened its entrance into the Texas market in 1988 when it acquired Grand Bancshares. This was the first of 21 Texas acquisitions.

In 1990, Comerica received approval to construct a new headquarters building, One Detroit Center.

In 1991, the bank expanded to California by acquiring Plaza Commerce Bancorp and InBancshares.

In 1992, the bank merged with a similarly sized Detroit-based bank, Manufacturers National Corporation. The merger of Comerica and Manufacturers created one of the country's 25 largest bank holding companies.

In 1996, the bank sold its Illinois operation to LaSalle Bank parent ABN Amro for $190 million.

In 1998, the bank signed a 30-year $66 million agreement for the naming rights to Comerica Park in downtown Detroit, home to the Detroit Tigers of Major League Baseball. A year later, Comerica would celebrate its 150th anniversary.

2000s 
In 2000, the bank sold its credit card division to MBNA and formed an alliance with the company.

In 2001, the bank acquired Imperial Bank of California, which also had branches in Arizona.

In late 2004, Comerica began a plan to diversify its operations by opening new banking centers in strong growth markets, primarily in Texas and California. Comerica opened 18 new banking centers in 2005, 25 new banking centers in 2006, and 30 banking centers in 2007.

On March 6, 2007, the company announced its decision to relocate its corporate headquarters to Dallas to move closer to its customer base in the Sun Belt. In August, the company announced that it selected 1717 Main Street in Downtown Dallas. The company executives began moving into the new location in November 2007 and the building was renamed Comerica Tower.

In January 2008, the United States Department of the Treasury selected the company as the issuing bank for its Direct Express debit card program. The federal government uses the Express Debit product to issue electronic payments, such as Social Security benefits, to people who do not have bank accounts (unbanked).

In July 2011, the bank acquired Sterling Bank of Texas for $1.03 billion. The acquisition virtually tripled Comerica's market share in Houston and provided entry into the San Antonio and Kerrville regions.

In 2017, the bank announced plans to reduce its office space by 500,000 square feet, saving $7 million in 2018.

Comerica celebrated a historic milestone in 2019, ushering in its 170th anniversary.

In May 2021, the bank announced that it would provide $5 billion in small business loans from 2021 to 2023.

Comerica expanded into North Carolina with the creation of its new Southeast Market in August 2021. With market headquarters in Raleigh, along with offices in Winston-Salem and Charlotte, the Southeast Market supports Wealth and Commercial Bank customers based in North Carolina, Florida, Georgia, South Carolina, Tennessee and Virginia.

Leadership

Curt Farmer 
Curtis C. Farmer is chairman, President and Chief Executive Officer of Comerica Incorporated and Comerica Bank. He also serves as a director of both organizations and leads Comerica's Management Executive Committee. Farmer joined Comerica as Executive Vice President of Wealth Management in 2008. He was named Vice Chairman of Comerica's Retail Bank and Wealth Management divisions in 2011, and President, Comerica Incorporated and Comerica Bank in 2015. Farmer was appointed as chief executive officer in April 2019 and assumed the role of chairman on January 1, 2020. Farmer joined Comerica from Wachovia Corporation of Charlotte, North Carolina, where he served as Executive Vice President, Wealth Management. During his 23 years with Wachovia, he held a variety of positions of increasing scope and responsibility.

Farmer holds a bachelor's degree from Wake Forest University, where he also earned his master's degree in business administration. Farmer's board affiliations are Texas Instruments, Circle 10 Council of the Boys Scouts of America, SMU Tate Lecture Series, SMU Cox School of Business Executive Board, The Clearing House, Crystal Charity Ball Advisory Board, Methodist Health System Foundation. Mr. Farmer remains involved with Wake Forest University Board and will be active on this Board again in June 2023.

Naming Rights and Sponsorships 
Comerica owns corporate naming rights of the following:

 Comerica Park in downtown Detroit, home to the Detroit Tigers of Major League Baseball.
 Comerica formerly sponsored the Comerica Theatre in Phoenix.

Comerica is a sponsor of the following:

 Exclusive presenting partner of the iconic Fox Theatre in the heart of The District Detroit.
 Comerica Bank Free Prix Day, an annual event at the Chevrolet Detroit Grand Prix.
 From 2007 to 2010, the Comerica Bank New Year's Parade in Dallas.

References

External links

Banks based in Texas
Banks based in the Dallas–Fort Worth metroplex
American companies established in 1849
Banks established in 1849
Companies based in Dallas
Companies listed on the New York Stock Exchange
1849 establishments in Michigan